The mixmole de pescado is a dish of Mexican cuisine. It consists of a combination of fried fish, chopped chards, epazote and nopalitos, boiled in a green sauce, which is made with a ground mixture of green tomatoes, chili peppers, and garlic, then fried in oil. The fried fish is added at the end to avoid tearing it.

References
 Barros, Cristina. (2008). Los libros de la cocina mexicana. 

Mexican cuisine
Fish dishes